Chulok is a rural locality (a selo) and the administrative center of Chulokskoye Rural Settlement, Buturlinovsky District, Voronezh Oblast, Russia. The population was 610 as of 2010. There are 7 streets.

Geography 
Chulok is located 13 km northeast of Buturlinovka (the district's administrative centre) by road. Udarnik is the nearest rural locality.

References 

Rural localities in Buturlinovsky District